Rhopalovalva orbiculata is a species of moth of the family Tortricidae. It is found in China (Fujian, Henan, Hunan, Guangxi, Guizhou).

The wingspan is 10–12 mm. The forewings are fulvous with dark brown transverse lines. There are seven pairs of grey streaks at the costa. The hindwings are grey.

Etymology
The specific name refers to the cucullus of the male genitalia ventrally bearing a slender process roundly dilated distally and is derived from Latin orbiculatus (meaning round).

References

Moths described in 2004
Eucosmini